Jaén Airport also known as Shumba Airport  is an airport serving Jaén, the capital of Jaén Province in the Cajamarca Region of Peru. It is owned and operated by CORPAC S.A.

There is rising terrain to the east.

Airlines and destinations

See also

Transport in Peru
List of airports in Peru

References

External links
OurAirports - Jaén
OpenStreetMap - Shumba

SkyVector - Jaen Shumba Airport

Airports in Peru
Buildings and structures in Cajamarca Region